Tugaga Maulalo (died 1986) was a Western Samoan politician and judge. He served as a member of the Legislative Assembly from 1976 to 1979.

Biography
A civil servant, Maulalo served as a clerk and administrative officer. He contested the Gaga'ifomauga No. 2 constituency in the 1976 elections, deafting  Malaitai Magasiva by five votes. He lost his seat in the 1979 elections, finishing fourth out of five candidates. He was subsequently appointed as a judge on the Land and Titles Court.

He died at his home in 1986.

References

Samoan civil servants
Members of the Legislative Assembly of Samoa
Land and Titles Court of Samoa judges
1986 deaths